was a Japanese philosophy student and poet, largely remembered due to his farewell poem.

Biography
Fujimura was born in Hokkaidō. His grandfather was a former samurai of the Morioka Domain, and his father relocated to Hokkaidō after the Meiji Restoration as a director of the forerunner of Hokkaido Bank. Fujimura graduated from middle school in Sapporo, and then relocated to Tokyo where he attended a preparatory school for entry into Tokyo Imperial University.

He later traveled to Kegon Falls in Nikko, a famed scenic area, and wrote his farewell poem directly on the trunk of a tree before committing suicide. His grave is at Aoyama Cemetery in Tokyo.

The story was soon sensationalized in contemporary newspapers, and was commented upon by the famed writer Natsume Sōseki, an English teacher at Fujimura's high school. Sōseki later wrote on his death in Kusamakura.

Poem

References 

土門公記（Domon Kouki）: 藤村操の手紙－華厳の滝に眠る16歳のメッセージ. Shimotsuke Shimbunsha, 2002, 

1886 births
1903 suicides
People from Sapporo
People from Tokyo
College students who committed suicide
Suicides by drowning in Japan
20th-century Japanese poets
19th-century Japanese poets